Ljubica ( and ) is a Slavic feminine given name meaning "love" or "kiss", where -ica is a diminutive suffix. Also, ljubica means violet, while the actual flower is ljubičica, a superdiminutive. It is Serbo-Croatian in origin, used throughout the former Yugoslavia.

Variants 
 Bulgarian: Lyubitsa, Любица
 Slovak: Ľubica

See also 
Ljuba (name)
Ljubomir (given name)

Serbian feminine given names
Slavic feminine given names
Bulgarian feminine given names
Croatian feminine given names
Macedonian feminine given names
Montenegrin feminine given names
Slovene feminine given names